Cunene is a province of Angola. It has an area of 87,342 km2 and a population of 990,087 in 2014.

Ondjiva is the capital of the province; it was previously known as Vila Pereira d’Eça. Ondjiva is the only city in this province. The distance from Ondjiva to Luanda is 1424 km and to Lubango is 415 km. The Cunene River gave its name to the province.

Cunene lies north of the Cunene River, which forms the border between Angola and Namibia. Cunene is traversed by the northwesterly line of equal latitude and longitude.

During World War I the region was the scene of fighting in 1914–15.  The German campaign in Angola  resulted in Germany's temporary occupation of the area.

The inhabitants of the Province are overwhelmingly Ovambo pastoralists. Since the 1960s, they have been under pressure first from white settlers, and after independence from high-ranking military officers and politicians, who acquired large extensions of land which the Ovambo need for the transhumance of their cattle. The ecological, economic and social advantage of pastoralism over ranching has been known since the 1970s, but has not been sufficiently taken into account in policy making.

Municipalities
The province of Cunene contains six municipalities:

 Cahama
 Kuroka (Curoca)
 Kuvelai (Cuvelai)
 Kwanhama (Cuanhama)
 Namakunde (Namacunde)
 Ombadja

Communes
The province of Cunene contains the following communes; sorted by their respective municipalities:

 Cahama Municipality: – Cahama, Oxinjau (Otchinjau)
 Kuroka Municipality: – Chitado, Oncócua
 Kuvelai Municipality: – Calonga, Cuvati (Cubati), Mucolongodijo (Mukolongodjo), Mupa (Omunda)
 Kwanhama Municipality: – Evale, Môngua, Nehone-Cafima, Ondjiva, Simporo (Tchimporo-Yonde)
 Namakunde Municipality: – Melunga-Chiede, Namakunde (Namacunde)
 Ombadja Municipality: – Humbe, Mucope, Naulila, Ombala yo Mungu, Xangongo

List of governors of Cunene

In popular culture
In Call of Duty: Black Ops II, UNITA under Jonas Savimbi assists Alex Mason and Jason Hudson to find the CIA remnants under Woods held by the MPLA and the Cubans.

See also
 Kunene Region in Namibia

References

External links
Official website of province governor
Information on this province at the Angolan ministry for territorial administration
Information on this province at Info Angola
Province geographical info at geoview.info

 
Provinces of Angola